The 2022–23 Oregon State Beavers women's basketball team represented Oregon State University during the 2022–23 NCAA Division I women's basketball season. The Beavers were led by thirteenth-year head coach Scott Rueck, and they played their games at Gill Coliseum as members of the Pac-12 Conference.

Previous season
The Beavers finished the 2021–22 season 17–14, 6–19 in Pac-12 play to finish in eighth place. As the No. 8 seed in the Pac-12 tournament, they defeated Arizona State in the first round before losing to Stanford in the quarterfinals. They were invited to the WNIT where they defeated Long Beach State in the first round, Portland in the second round and New Mexico in the third round before losing to Pac-12 member UCLA in the quarterfinals.

Offseason

Departures

Incoming

Recruiting

Recruiting class of 2023

Roster

Schedule

|-
!colspan=9 style=| Exhibition

|-
!colspan=9 style=| Regular season

|-
!colspan=9 style=|Pac-12 Women's Tournament

Source:

Rankings

*The preseason and week 1 polls were the same.^Coaches did not release a week 2 poll.

See also
 2022–23 Oregon State Beavers men's basketball team

Notes

References

Oregon State Beavers women's basketball seasons
Oregon State
Oregon State Beavers women's basketball
Oregon State Beavers women's basketball